Preso No. 1 is an American political thriller drama television series produced by Keshet International and Telemundo Global Studios based on an original idea of idea by Shira Hadad and Dror Mishani who are also executive producers. It premiered on 30 July 2019 and ended on 27 September 2019.

Episodes

References 

Lists of crime drama television series episodes
Lists of Spanish television series episodes
Lists of American drama television series episodes